Multinucleate cells (also known as multinucleated or polynuclear cells) are eukaryotic cells that have more than one nucleus per cell, i.e., multiple nuclei share one common cytoplasm. Mitosis in multinucleate cells can occur either in a coordinated, synchronous manner where all nuclei divide simultaneously or asynchronously where individual nuclei divide independently in time and space. Certain organisms may have a multinuclear stage of their life cycle. For example, slime molds have a vegetative, multinucleate life stage called a plasmodium.

Although not normally viewed as a case of multinucleation, plant cells share a common cytoplasm by plasmodesmata, and most cells in animal tissues are in communication with their neighbors via gap junctions.

Multinucleate cells, depending on the mechanism by which they are formed, can be divided into "syncytia" (formed by cell fusion) or "coenocytes" (formed by nuclear division not being followed by cytokinesis).

A number of dinoflagellates are known to have two nuclei. Unlike other multinucleated cells these nuclei contain two distinct lineages of DNA: one from the dinoflagellate and the other from a symbiotic diatom.

Some bacteria, such as Mycoplasma pneumoniae, a pathogen of the respiratory tract, may display multinuclear filaments as a result of a delay between genome replication and cellular division.

Terminology 
Some biologists use the term "acellular" to refer to multinucleate cell forms (syncitia and plasmodia), such as to differentiate "acellular" slime molds from the purely "cellular" ones (which do not form such structures). This usage is incorrect and highly misleading to laymen, and as such it is strongly discouraged.

Some use the term "syncytium" in a wide sense, to mean any type of multinucleate cell, while others differentiate the terms for each type.

Physiological examples

Syncytia

Syncytia are multinuclear cells that can form either through normal biological processes, such as the mammalian placenta, or under the influence of certain pathogens, such as HIV, via fusion of the plasma membrane. Other examples include the skeletal muscle cells of mammals, the tapetal cells of plants, and the storage cells of Douglas-fir seeds. The polymorphonuclear leukocytes of mammals are not polynuclear cells, although the lobes of their nuclei are so deeply bifurcated that they can appear so under non-optimal microscopy.

Osteoclasts are multinuclear cells that are found commonly in the human body that aid in the maintenance and repair of the bones by secreting acid that dissolves bone matter. They are typically found to have 5 nuclei per cell, due to the fusion of preosteoclasts.

The chlorarachniophytes form multinucleate cells by fusion, being syncytia and not coenocytes. This syncytia is called plasmodium, in the sense of a multinucleate protoplast without a cell wall which exhibits amoeboid movement. Other examples include some plasmodiophorids, some haplosporidians, and the grex of cellular slime moulds (dictyostelids and acrasids).

Placenta 
The placenta, a temporary organ that transports nutrients, oxygen, waste, and other materials between a mother and a developing fetus, is partially composed of a syncytial layer that forms the interface between the foetus and the mother. In addition to performing simple interface duties, the placental syncytia also acts as a barrier to infection from viruses, bacteria, and protozoa, which is likely due to unique cytoskeletal properties of these cells.

Coenocytes 

Furthermore, multinucleate cells are produced from specialized cell cycles in which nuclear division occurs without cytokinesis,  thus leading to large coenocytes or plasmodia. In filamentous fungi, multinucleate cells may extend over hundreds of meters so that different regions of a single cell experience dramatically different microenvironments. Other examples include, the plasmodia of plasmodial slime molds (myxogastrids) and the schizont of the Plasmodium parasite which causes malaria.

Pathological examples
Multinucleated cells can also occur under pathological conditions as the consequence of a disturbed cell cycle control (e.g., some binucleated cells and metastasizing tumor cells).

Human Immunodeficiency Virus 
As previously mentioned, syncytia may be induced through the actions of Human Immunodeficiency Virus, where T-cells are fused by the action of virus-derived proteins on the cell membrane. During viral replication in T lymphoid cells, large amounts of viral envelope Glycoprotein (Env) are synthesized and trafficked to the cell membrane where they can be incorporated into new virus particles. However, some of the Env molecules interact with neighboring T-cell receptors, which brings the cells into close enough proximity to enable trigger events culminating in the fusion of two host cells, likely due to the close contact of the two plasma membranes. This interaction is likely specific to CD4+ T-cells, as cells lacking this receptor were unable to form syncytia in laboratory conditions.

References 

Cell biology